Juan Barahona Zapata del Águila (October, 1578 – 19 November, 1632) was a Catholic prelate who served as Bishop of Nicaragua (1631–1632).

Biography
Juan Barahona Zapata del Águila was born in Madrid, Spain in October 1578. On 3 December 1631, he was appointed during the papacy of Pope Urban VIII as Bishop of Nicaragua. On 28 October 1632, he was consecrated bishop by Gregorio Pedrosa Cásares, Bishop of León with Juan Bravo Lagunas, Bishop Emeritus of Ugento, and Cristóforo Chrisostome Carletti, Bishop of Termia, serving as co-consecrators. He served as Bishop of Nicaragua until his death on 19 November 1632. While bishop, he was the principal co-consecrator of Alfonso de Franco y Luna, Bishop of Durango (1632).

References

External links and additional sources
 (for Chronology of Bishops) 
 (for Chronology of Bishops) 

17th-century Roman Catholic bishops in Nicaragua
Bishops appointed by Pope Urban VIII
People from Madrid
1578 births
1632 deaths
Roman Catholic bishops of León in Nicaragua